La Baule-les-Pins is a quartier of La Baule-Escoublac, Loire-Atlantique, France.
La Baule has two gare SNCFs, the barely-used eponymous station, and the main La-Baule-Escoublac.

References

Seaside resorts in France